Dactylorhiza insularis is a species of terrestrial (ground-dwelling) plant, in the genus Dactylorhiza in the orchid family (Orchidaceae). It is native to the western Mediterranean region: Spain, Portugal, Morocco, France (including Corsica), and Italy (Sardinia, Emilia-Romagna, Toscana).

References

External links

insularis
Plants described in 1895
Orchids of Europe
Flora of Morocco